The Medicine Range is a group of hills and low mountains in southern Elko County, in the northeastern section of the state of Nevada in the Great Basin region of the western United States.

Notes 

Mountain ranges of Nevada
Mountain ranges of Elko County, Nevada